Samuel Murray John Prattley (born 16 January 1990) is a New Zealand rugby union player who currently plays as a prop for  in the ITM Cup.

Early career

Born in Blenheim, and raised in the rural town of Rai Valley, Prattley played rugby from an early age and followed in the footsteps of his father and uncle in representing the Pelorus Rugby club.   He moved to nearby Nelson to attend high school at Nelson College and played first XV rugby during his time there.

Senior career

After graduating high school, Prattley made his way through club rugby and then made his national provincial championship bow in 2010 with the Nelson-based  Makos for whom he would go on to make 29 appearances for in 3 seasons.   He headed north to join  ahead of the 2013 ITM Cup and quickly established himself as a regular in the number 1 jersey.   He made 9 appearances, 6 of which were from the start in his first season in New Zealand's largest city before starting all 11 of Auckland's games during the 2014 ITM Cup which saw them reach the Premiership semi-finals before losing to  after extra-time.

2015 saw him play an additional 9 games for Auckland as they reached the Premiership final before losing narrowly to  while 2016 was a year of disappointment both for him and his side.   Auckland missed out on the Premiership play-offs altogether with a 5th place finish on the log standings and injury limited Prattley to just 5 starts during the season.

Super Rugby

His move north to Auckland opened up new doors for him and injuries in the  front-row saw him brought in as emergency cover during the 2013 Super Rugby season. He went on to represent the Blues 4 times that year and was upgraded to a full contract for the following season. He turned out 10 times in 2014 and 9 times in 2015 with the majority of his appearances coming from the substitutes bench.

2016 saw Tana Umaga replace Sir John Kirwan as Blues head coach and this change saw Prattley become a more regular starter, playing 10 times during the season with 9 of these appearances coming from the start.   Despite his injury problems during New Zealand's 2016 domestic season, Prattley maintained his place in the Blues squad for 2017.

International

Prattley was a member of the New Zealand Under-20 side which won the 2010 IRB Junior World Championship.   He scored 1 try in the 3 appearances as the tournament which was held in Argentina.

Career Honours

New Zealand Under-20

World Rugby Under 20 Championship - 2010

Super Rugby Statistics

References

1990 births
New Zealand rugby union players
Tasman rugby union players
Blues (Super Rugby) players
Auckland rugby union players
Chiefs (rugby union) players
Rugby union props
People educated at Nelson College
Rugby union players from Blenheim, New Zealand
Living people
Sunwolves players